There's Know Place Like Home is Kansas' fifth live album. It was released as a double CD and also on DVD on October 13, 2009 and Blu-ray on November 23, 2009. The DVD charted at No. 5 on the Billboard Music DVD chart the week of its release, Kansas's only appearance on that chart.

There's Know Place Like Home is a recording of a concert that took place on February 7, 2009 in Topeka, Kansas at Washburn University (which several members of Kansas attended) along with the Washburn University Symphony Orchestra. The concert featured several orchestral arrangements by Larry Baird of Kansas songs (Baird also served as conductor for this concert) - arrangements the band has been playing with symphony orchestras around the US since the release of 1998's Always Never the Same which featured the London Symphony Orchestra accompanying the band.

The cover features the old man depicted on the cover of Leftoverture and the papers around him with a black background.

A special edition bundle has been released, containing the DVD and two CDs of the concert.

Track listings

DVD, Blu-ray and European double CD edition

US CD track listing

Personnel
Kansas
Steve Walsh - keyboards, lead vocals
Rich Williams - lead guitar, acoustic guitar
David Ragsdale - violin, electric guitar, backing vocals
Billy Greer - bass guitar, acoustic guitar, lead and backing vocals
Phil Ehart - drums, director

Guest musicians
Larry Baird - conductor, orchestral arrangements
Kerry Livgren - guitar
Steve Morse - guitar

Production
Jeff Glixman - director, producer, mixing
Jim Gentile - producer
Zak Rizvi - director, video editor
Steve Angus - audio/video director and producer
Tom Gregory - audio/video producer
Curt Casassa - associate director
Steve Rawls, Jonathan Beckner - additional post-production
Darcy Proper - audio mastering
Christine Boyd - graphic design

Washburn University Symphony Orchestra

Washburn University Staff 
Lori Meador - White Concert Hall Director of Operations
Norman Gamoa - Conductor of the Washburn University Symphony Orchestra
Alex Wise - Assistant conductor
AnnMarie Snook - Chair of the WU Music Department
Lyle Waring - White Concert Hall tech
Mark Noble - Electrician
Lynn Wilson - Theater tech
Elisa Bicker - Pipe organ instructor

Violin 
Carlos Cabezas, Principal
Román Carranza
Emilio Castro
Manda Chui
Diana Crain
William Darst, Concertmaster
Amanda Huguenin
Eun Hye Kim
Robert Johnson
Valeriya Kanaeva
Michelle Lassiter
Michael Putnam
Manuel Tábora
Mario Zelaya

Viola 
Solmer Alvarez
Lucia Darst
Marcela Fernández
Caitlin Givens
Roberto Henríquez, Principal
Lindsay Paul

Cello 
Austin Abernathy
Samuel Cho, Principal
Taryn Doty
Milovan Paz
Esther Valladares
Phillip Watson

Bass 
Courtney Doole
Carrie Drexler, Principal
Jeff Torrez
Aaron Roeckers
Joel Stratton

Flute 
Erica Nightengale, Principal
Christopher Roth
Jessica Vogel, Piccolo

Oboe 
Robyn Bolton, English Horn
Chelsea Loder
José Salazar, Principal

Clarinet 
Amanda Mayo, Principal
Anthony Roth
Bailey Altman, Bass Clarinet

Bassoon 
Natalie Moreland, Principal
Genni Newsham

Horn 
James Gutiérrez
Anna Lischke, Associate Principal
Raúl Rodríguez, Principal
Jacob Trabert
Yiyang Zhang

Trumpet 
James Kirkwood
Travis Mott
Juan Pablo Rodríguez, Principal
Jakub Roštík

Trombone 
Neil McKay
Tyson Sterling
Paul Kirkwood, Principal

Tuba 
Benjamin Thomson, Principal

Harp 
Lauren Woidela
Mariela Flores, Principal

Keyboards 
Allegra Fisher, Principal
Jordan Ward, Celesta

Timpani & percussion 
William Arasmith
Matthew Bell
Jason Degenhardt
Brandon Graves
David Liston
Theodore Musick, Principal
Lucas Whippo
David Wingerson

References

Kansas (band) live albums
2009 live albums
2009 video albums
Inside Out Music live albums
Inside Out Music video albums
Albums produced by Jeff Glixman